This is a list of patron saints of ailments, illnesses, and dangers.

A
Abd-al-Masih – sterile women (in Syria)
Abel of Reims – patron of the blind and the lame
Abhai – venomous reptiles
Agapitus of Palestrina – invoked against colic
Agatha – breast cancer
Agathius – headache
Agricola of Avignon – bubonic plague, misfortunes
Agrippina of Mineo – invoked against evil spirits, leprosy, thunderstorms, bacterial diseases, and bacterial infections
Alberto Marvelli - politicians, athletes, road safety
Albinus of Angers – against pirate attack
Alfie Lambe - stomach cancer, youth, people who suffer from shyness
Aloysius Gonzaga – the blind
Alphonsa–against diseases in the feet
Alphonsus Liguori – arthritis
Amabilis of Riom – invoked against fire, snakes, and snake bites; also invoked against demonic possession, mental illness, poison, wild beasts
Andrew the Apostle - convulsions, gout, sore throat, fever, whooping cough
Andrew Avellino – sudden death
Andrew Corsini – riot, civil disorder
Anthony – skin disease, Saint Anthony's fire
Anthony of Padua – Missing people and lost things
Apollinaris – epilepsy, gout
Apollonia – toothache
Arthelais – kidnapping, illness
Aspren – invoked against migraine
Audoin (Ouen) – deafness
Augustine of Hippo – sore eyes
Adrian of Nicomedia – plague, epilepsy

B
Balbina – scrofula
Benedict Joseph Labre - the mentally ill, homeless
Berlinda of Meerbeke – invoked against cattle diseases
Bernadette - the sick, asthma sufferers, nurses and carers
Bernardino of Siena – chest problems, lung problems, gambling addictions
Bessus – protector of soldiers against the dangers of war; also invoked for fertility.
Saint Bibiana - epilepsy, hangovers, headaches, insanity, mental illness
Blaise – ailments of the throat

C
Caesarius of Terracina - invoked against drowning, flooding, and for the good success of Caesarean section
Cajetan – invoked against illegal gamblings
Cannera - against drowning, nyctophobia
Carlos Manuel Rodriguez - crohns disease and IBS
Casimiro Barello - the homeless, pneumonia
Castulus – invoked against erysipelas, lightning, horse theft, wildfires, and drowning
Catherine of Vadstena – against abortion, miscarriage
Christina the Astonishing – against insanity, mental disorders.
Clementina Nengapeta - victims of rape, humour
Coloman – plague, sick horses, against hanging
Conrad of Piacenza – against hernias
Cornelius – invoked against epilepsy, cramps, afflictions associated with the nerves and ears
Crescentinus – headache
Cyriacus – eye disease

D
Damien of Molokai – leprosy, HIV and AIDS
Defendens – invoked against wolves and fires
Deicolus – childhood illnesses
Denise – against headaches and motorcycle/bicycle accidents
Deodatus of Nevers – against thunderstorm, evil spirits, and plague
Dometius of Persia – invoked against sciatica
Domninus of Fidenza – rabies
Dymphna – sleepwalking, epilepsy, insanity, mental illness

E
Edmund the Martyr of East Anglia - patron saint of pandemics
Emygdius of Ascoli – invoked against earthquakes
Engelmund of Velsen – invoked against toothache
Epipodius – victims of betrayal and of torture
Erasmus of Formiae or St Elmo – invoked against colic in children, intestinal ailments and diseases, cramps and the pain of women in labour
Eurosia – invoked against storms, hail storms, lightning
Expeditus – invoked against procrastination

F
Felipe Ruiz Fraile - youth, tailors, cooks, slow learners
Fiacre – Venereal disease sufferers, hemorrhoids
Fillan – mental illness
Florian – invoked against fire, floods and drowning
Flora of Beaulieu - people who suffer depression
Four Holy Marshals – epidemics, diseases
Fourteen Holy Helpers – epidemics, bubonic plague or the Black Death

G
Gangulphus – eye and skin conditions; knee pains; invoked against adultery and marital difficulties
Gemma Galgani – invoked against spinal injuries, back pain, headaches, loss of parents
 Genesius of Rome – actors, clowns, comedians, comics, converts, dancers, musicians, stenographers, printers, lawyers, epileptics, thieves, torture victims
Gerard of Lunel – invoked against epilepsy and headaches
Gerard Majella – pregnancy
Gereon – headaches, migraine
Germaine Cousin - skin diseases, victims of child abuse 
Gertrude of Nivelles – invoked against fever, rats, and mice, particularly field-mice.
Giuseppe Benedetto Cottolengo – invoked against cirrhosis and other liver diseases
Godelina – throat trouble
Gotthard of Hildesheim – invoked against fever, dropsy, childhood sicknesses, hailstones, the pain of childbirth, and gout
Gratus of Aosta – against lightning; fear of insects
Guy of Anderlecht – invoked against epilepsy, against rabies, against infantile convulsions

H
Hemma of Gurk – invoked during childbirth and against diseases of the eye
Hermes – mental illnesses
Harvey – eye problems, eye disease
Hippolytus of Rome – sick horses
Hubertus - Rabies
Hugh of Cluny – fever
Hyacinth – those in danger of drowning

J
James the Great – rheumatism
John of Bridlington – women in difficult labor
John of God - the mentally ill
John Berchmans -- students, youth
John Macias - the souls in purgatory.
Joseph – against doubt, against hesitation, dying people, expectant mothers, happy death, holy death, interior souls, people in doubt, pioneers, pregnant women, travellers, and fetuses
Joseph of Anchieta –  of those who suffer scoliosis
Jude Thaddaeus – lost causes, desperate situations
Julia of Corsica – pathologies of the hands and the feet
Juliana of Nicomedia – childbirth, sickness
John Henry Newman – against sepsis.

K
Kentigern – against bullies and verbal abuse

L
Lorenzo Ruiz – poor, immigrants, migrant workers, separated families
Leodegar (Saint Mungo) – blindness, eye disease, eye problems, sore eyes
Leoluca – invoked as a protector from natural disasters, plague, invasion.
Liborius of Le Mans – against gallstones, colic
Lucy of Syracuse – haemorrhage, eye complaints

M
Macrina the Elder – poverty
Mammes – protector of sufferers from broken bones and hernias
Marciana of Mauretania – invoked to cure wounds
St. Marciana of Toledo – curing of wounds
Marculf – scrofula, diseases of the skin
Mary Magdalene – people ridiculed for their piety, penitent sinners, prostitutes, repentance, sexual temptation
Maria Goretti – victims of rape, crime victims, invoked against pedophiles.
Martin of Tours – alcoholism
Matthias – alcoholism, smallpox
Maturinus – invoked against mental illness and infertility
St. Maurus – rheumatism, gout, epilepsy
Maximilian Kolbe – drug addiction
Maximin of Trier – invoked as protection against perjury, loss at sea and destructive rains
St. Medard – toothache
St. Michael the Archangel – against danger at sea, against temptations, holy death, sick people, storms at sea, police officers.
Miliau – against rheumatism

N
Natalia of Nicomedia – plague, epilepsy
Nonnosus – diseases of the kidneys, invoked against physical defects, back pains, and school-related students' crises
Nicholas of Trani - the mentally ill, the homeless

O
Saint Olaf – difficult marriage
Saint Ovidius – auditory conditions and diseases

P
Pacificus of San Severino – chronic pain
Paraskevi of Rome – protectress of blind people
Patroclus of Troyes – demons, fever
Peregrine of Auxerre – against snake bites
Saint Peregrine Laziosi – cancer
Saint Peter – involved against criminals
Saint Peter of Saint Joseph de Betancur – those who serve the sick
Saint Paulina – Diabetics
Pancras – cramp, headache, bearing false witness, perjury
Pharaildis – childhood diseases; difficult marriages; victims of abuse
Saint Pio of Pietrelcina – Stress relief and New year blues
Polycarp – earache, dysentery
Potamiana – protector of rape victims

Q
Saint Quentin – coughs, sneezes, and dropsy.
Quirinus of Neuss – invoked against the bubonic plague, smallpox, and gout
Quiteria – against rabies

R
Rasso – invoked against stomach pains, especially in children
Regina – against poverty, impoverishment, torture victims
Reinildis – to cure open wounds, against eye diseases
Reverianus – invoked against drought
Roch – invoked against cholera, epidemics, knee problems, plague, skin diseases
Rita of Cascia – lost causes or impossible cases, marital problems, abuse

S

Sebaldus – against cold and cold weather
 Sebastian - against plague
Scholastica – convulsive children; invoked against storms and rain
Servatius – invoked against foot troubles, lameness, rheumatism, rats, and mice
Silvia – invoked by pregnant women for safe delivery of children
Sithney – invoked against rabies
Suitbert of Kaiserwerdt – angina
Symphorian – syphilis, eye troubles

T

Theobald of Provins – invoked against fever; afflictions associated with the eyes; Dry cough; infertility; panic attacks
Trophimus of Arles – against drought
Tryphon – against infestations of bedbugs, rodents and locusts

U
Ubald – migraine, neuralgia, sick children, autism, obsessive compulsive disorder
Urban of Langres – invoked against blight, frost, storms, alcoholism, and faintness
Ursicinus of Saint-Ursanne – invoked against stiff neck
Ursus of Aosta – faintness, kidney disease, and rheumatism

V
Valentine – fainting, plague, epilepsy
Victor of Marseilles – invoked against lightning
Vitalis of Assisi – diseases and sicknesses affecting the genitals
Vitus – Choreas (Sydenham's chorea, Huntington's disease), epilepsy, seizures, oversleeping

W
Walter of Pontoise – invoked against stress
Wilgefortis – people seeking relief from tribulations, in particular by women who wished to be liberated from abusive husbands.
William Firmatus – against headache
Willibrord – convulsions, epilepsy, epileptics
Winnoc – fever, whooping cough
Wulfram of Sens – for protection against the dangers of the sea.

See also 

Patron saints of occupations and activities
Patron saints of places
Patronage of the Blessed Virgin Mary

References

Lists of saints
Religion and health